Ove Andersson (14 March 1916, Malmö – 1983, Borås) was a Swedish footballer. He is notable for being first Allsvenskan top scorer for Malmö FF, sharing the title with Yngve Lindgren of Örgryte IS and Erik Persson of AIK with 16 goals each for the 1938–39 season.

Honours

Individual
Allsvenskan Top Scorer: 1938–39

References

1916 births
1983 deaths
Swedish footballers
Malmö FF players
Allsvenskan players
Footballers from Malmö
Association football midfielders